Kolokolo is a town in the Moussodougou Department of Comoé Province in south-western Burkina Faso. The town's estimated population in 2005 was 1,360.

References

External links
Satellite map at Maplandia.com

Populated places in the Cascades Region
Comoé Province